This article contains information about the literary events and publications of 1918.

Events
January 1 – The English novelist and wartime propagandist Hall Caine is made a Knight of the KBE.
January 2 – The English novelist Marie Corelli is convicted under wartime legislation against hoarding food.
January 18 – The first edition of Aussie: The Australian Soldiers' Magazine appears.
January 23 – The English poet Robert Graves marries the painter Nancy Nicholson in London. The wedding guests include Wilfred Owen, whose first nationally published poem appears three days later ("Miners" in The Nation). He will be killed by the end of the year.

March
The Telemachus episode in James Joyce's Ulysses is published in serialized form in the U.S. journal The Little Review.
The English novelist Alec Waugh is taken prisoner of war. He will be incarcerated in Mainz Citadel with the monologist J. Milton Hayes, also taken prisoner this year, and Hugh Kingsmill.
April
Hu Shih, chief advocate of the use of the vernacular in Chinese literature at the time, publishes an essay, "Constructive Literary Revolution – A Literature of National Speech" in the magazine New Youth (Xin Qingnian) proposing a four-point reform program.
The English writer May Sinclair introduces the term "Stream of consciousness" to describe a narrative mode, in a discussion of Dorothy Richardson's novel sequence Pilgrimage in The Egoist.
May 3 – The New Zealand writer and poet Katherine Mansfield marries her long-time partner John Middleton Murry at Kensington register office in London.
June
The 2nd annual Pulitzer Prizes are awarded in the United States, including the first award for a novel.
The English poet Basil Bunting is imprisoned as a conscientious objector.
August 17 – The poets Wilfred Owen and Siegfried Sassoon meet for the last time, in London, and spend what Sassoon will recall as "the whole of a hot cloudless afternoon together."
October 3 – Siegfried Sassoon visits his mentor Robbie Ross for the last time. Sassoon will write later that Ross's goodbye gave him a "presentiment of final farewell."
November 4 – Wilfred Owen is killed in action aged 25, at the Sambre–Oise Canal, with only five of his poems published. News of his death reaches his parents in Shrewsbury a week later on Armistice Day. He is awarded a posthumous Military Cross a year later.
December – The Poems of Gerard Manley Hopkins (died 1889, including The Wreck of the Deutschland, 1875/1876) are published through Robert Bridges. Few were published in Hopkins' lifetime, so that this introduces his innovative sprung rhythm and imagery to many readers.
December 28 – Emperor Khải Định of Vietnam declares the traditional Chữ nôm script for the Vietnamese language to be replaced by the Latin script Vietnamese alphabet.
Winter – Parisian farceur Georges Feydeau contracts tertiary syphilis.

New books

Fiction
Ryūnosuke Akutagawa – "Hell Screen" (地獄変, Jigokuhen; short story)
Arnold Bennett – The Roll-Call
Victor Bridges – The Lady from Long Acre
Willa Cather – My Ántonia
Blaise Cendrars
I Have Killed (J'ai tué)
The Severed Hand (La Main coupée)
J. Storer Clouston – The Man from the Clouds
Marie Corelli – The Young Diana
Grazia Deledda – L'incendio nell'oliveto (The fire in the olive-grove)
Ethel M. Dell – Greatheart
Alfred Döblin – Wadzeks Kampf mit der Dampfturbine (Wadzek's Struggle with the Steam Turbine)
Sarah Lee Brown Fleming – Hope's Highway
Mary E. Wilkins Freeman – Edgewater People
August Gailit – Fairyland
Owen Gregory – Meccania the Super-State
Thea von Harbou – Das indische Grabmal
 Frederic S. Isham – Three Live Ghosts
Herbert George Jenkins – Patricia Brent, Spinster
Wyndham Lewis – Tarr (in book form)
Lu Xun – "Diary of a Madman" (狂人日記, "Kuángrén Rìjì", short story)
Compton Mackenzie – The Early Life and Adventures of Sylvia Scarlett
Brinsley MacNamara (John Weldon writing as Oliver Blyth) – The Valley of the Squinting Windows
Heinrich Mann – Der Untertan
Frans Masereel – 25 Images of a Man's Passion (wordless novel)
André Maurois – Les Silences du Colonel Bramble
George Moore – A Story-Teller's Holiday
Baroness Orczy
Flower o' the Lily
The Man in Grey
Leo Perutz – From Nine to Nine (Zwischen neun und neun, originally Freiheit)
Romain Rolland – Colas Breugnon
Henry De Vere Stacpoole – The Man Who Lost Himself
Junichiro Tanizaki (谷崎 潤一郎) – Gold and Silver (金と銀)
Booth Tarkington – The Magnificent Ambersons
 Edgar Wallace 
 The Clue of the Twisted Candle
 Down Under Donovan
 The Man Who Knew
 Those Folk of Bulboro 
Mary Augusta Ward – The War and Elizabeth
Rebecca West – The Return of the Soldier
Edith Wharton – The Marne
Francis Brett Young – The Crescent Moon

Musical Theatre
Harry Carroll and Joseph McCarthy – Oh, Look!

Children and young people
Elsa Beskow – Tant Grön, tant Brun och tant Gredelin (Aunt Green, Aunt Brown and Aunt Lavender)
Edgar Rice Burroughs – Tarzan and the Jewels of Opar
May Gibbs – Tales of Snugglepot and Cuddlepie: their adventures wonderful
Johnny Gruelle – Raggedy Ann Stories
Norman Lindsay – The Magic Pudding: Being The Adventures of Bunyip Bluegum and his friends Bill Barnacle and Sam Sawnoff
Ferenc Móra – Kincskereső kisködmön (A Little Fortune-Hunting Frock Coat)
Beatrix Potter – The Tale of Johnny Town-Mouse

Drama
Bertolt Brecht – Baal (written)
John Drinkwater – Abraham Lincoln
Marcel Gerbidon and Paul Armont – School for Coquettes (L'École des cocottes)
Susan Glaspell – Tickless Time
 Walter C. Hackett – The Freedom of the Seas
Hugo von Hofmannsthal – The Difficult Man
James Joyce – Exiles
Georg Kaiser – Gas
Alice Dunbar Nelson – Mine Eyes Have Seen
Gregorio Martínez Sierra – Sueño de Una Noche de Agosto (Dream of an August Night)
Vladimir Mayakovsky – Mystery-Bouffe («Мистерия-Буфф», Misteriya-Buff)
Emma Orczy (Baroness Orczy) – The Legion of Honour (adaptation of A Sheaf of Bluebells)
Luigi Pirandello
But It's Nothing Serious (Ma non è una cosa seria)
The Rules of the Game (Il giuoco delle parti, literally The Game of Rôles)

Poetry

Guillaume Apollinaire – Calligrammes: Poems of Peace and War, 1913-1916
Laurence Binyon – The New World: Poems
Vera Brittain – Verses of a VAD
Toirdhealbhach Mac Suibhne (Terence MacSwiney) – Battle-cries
Walter de la Mare – The Marionettes
Siegfried Sassoon – Counter-Attack and Other Poems
Edward Thomas (posthumous) – Last Poems
Tristan Tzara – Vingt-cinq poèmes

Non-fiction
Henry Adams – The Education of Henry Adams
Enid Bagnold – A Diary Without Dates
Clive Bell – Pot-boilers
Laurence Binyon – For Dauntless France
François-Marie-Joseph Gourdon – An Account of the Entry of the Catholic Religion into Sichuan
William Inge – The Philosophy of Plotinus
Daniel Jones – An Outline of English Phonetics
Federico García Lorca – Impressiones y Paisajes (Impressions and Landscapes)
Walther Rathenau – An Deutschlands Jugend
Oswald Spengler – The Decline of the West (Der Untergang des Abendlandes)
Dr Marie Stopes
Married Love
Wise Parenthood
Lytton Strachey – Eminent Victorians
Mary Augusta Ward – A Writer's Recollections

Births
January 11 – Robert C. O'Brien, American novelist (died 1973)
January 16
Philip José Farmer, American science fiction writer (died 2009)
Stirling Silliphant, American writer, producer (died 1996)
February 1 – Muriel Spark, Scottish novelist (died 2006)
February 6 – Lothar-Günther Buchheim, German novelist, war correspondent and painter (died 2007)
March 9 – Mickey Spillane, American mystery writer (died 2006)
March 10 – Theodore Cogswell, American science fiction author (died 1987)
March 15 – Richard Ellmann, American literary biographer (died 1987)
April 23
Maurice Druon, French historical novelist (died 2009)
James Kirkup, English poet (died 2009)
May 16 – Juan Rulfo, Mexican author (died 1986)
June 9 – Bidhyanath Pokhrel, Nepali poet (died 1994) 
July 9 – John Heath-Stubbs, English poet and translator (died 2006)
July 14 – Arthur Laurents, American novelist and screenwriter (died 2011)
July 24 – Antonio Candido, Brazilian literary critic (died 2017)
August 9 – Robert Aldrich, American writer and filmmaker (died 1983)
August 20 – Jacqueline Susann, American novelist (died 1974)
August 27 – Leon Levițchi, Romanian translator (died 1991)
September 19 – Penelope Mortimer, Welsh-born English novelist and biographer (died 1999)
October 19 – Louis Althusser, French Marxist philosopher (died 1990)
October 22 – René de Obaldia, French playwright and poet (died 2022)
October 29 – Ștefan Baciu, Romanian and Brazilian poet, novelist and literary promoter (died 1993)
November 2 – Roger Lancelyn Green, English biographer (died 1987)
November 16 – Nicholas Moore, English poet (died 1986)
November 20 – Naomi Frankel, German-born Israeli novelist (died 2009)
November 25 – Peter Opie, English writer on children's literature and lore (died 1982)
November 29 – Madeleine L'Engle, American writer for children and teens (died 2007)
December 7 – Liu Yichang, Chinese novelist, editor and publisher (died 2018)
December 11 – Aleksandr Solzhenitsyn, Russian novelist (died 2008)
December 30 – Al Purdy, Canadian poet (died 2000)

Deaths
January 1 – William Wilfred Campbell, Canadian poet (born 1860)
January 6 – Dora Sigerson Shorter, Irish poet, novelist and sculptor (born 1866)
January 28 – John McCrae, Canadian military surgeon and war poet (pneumonia, born 1872)
February 8 – Lascăr Vorel, Romanian visual artist and short story writer (kidney disease, born 1879)
February 9 – E. J. Richmond, American novelist and children's writer (born 1825)
March 19 – Florence Anderson Clark, American author, newspaper editor, librarian, and university administrator (born 1835)
April 1 – Isaac Rosenberg, English poet and artist (killed in action, born 1890)
April – William Hope Hodgson, English author and essayist (killed in action, born 1877)
May 8 – Ernst von Hesse-Wartegg, Austrian writer and traveller (born 1851)
May 27 – Francis George Fowler, English grammarian (tuberculosis contracted on military service, born 1871)
June 10 – Arrigo Boito (Tobia Gorio), Italian poet and composer (born 1842)
June 26 – Peter Rosegger, Austrian poet (born 1843)
June 28 – Alexander Turnbull, New Zealand bibliophile (born 1868)
July 22 – Helen Stuart Campbell, American author, novelist and economist (born 1839)
July 26 – Helen Taggart Clark, American columnist, short story writer, and poet (born 1849)
July 30 – Joyce Kilmer, American poet (killed in action, born 1886)
August 3 – Maria Fetherstonhaugh, English novelist, born 1847)
October 5 – Robbie Ross, journalist (heart failure; born 1869)
October 21 – Jennie O. Starkey, journalist (pneumonia after influenza; born ca. 1856)
November 4
Wilfred Owen, English poet (killed in action, born 1893)
Andrew Dickson White, American diplomat and author (born 1832)
November 9 – Guillaume Apollinaire, French poet, dramatist, novelist and critic (influenza, born 1880)
November 14 – Seumas O'Kelly, Irish journalist and author (born 1881)
November 24 – Annie Hall Cudlip, English novelist, journalist and editor (born 1838)
December 1 – Margit Kaffka, Hungarian novelist, short story writer and poet (influenza, born 1880)
December 2 – Edmond Rostand, French poet and dramatist (influenza; born 1868)
December 15 – Salvatore Farina, Italian novelist (born 1846)
 unknown date — Eva Kinney Griffith, American journalist, temperance activist, novelist, newspaper editor, and journal publisher (born 1852)

Awards
Nobel Prize in Literature: not awarded
Pulitzer Prize for Drama: Jesse Lynch Williams, Why Marry?
Pulitzer Prize for Poetry: Sara Teasdale, Love Songs
Pulitzer Prize for the Novel: Ernest Poole, His Family

References

See also
World War I in literature

 
Years of the 20th century in literature